Commission v France (1997) C-265/95 is an EU law case concerning the free movement of goods in the European Union.

Facts
French farmers sabotaged imported agricultural produce, such as Spanish strawberries and Belgian tomatoes, and French authorities turned a blind eye. The Commission brought enforcement proceedings under TFEU article 258 for ‘failing to take all necessary and proportionate measures’ to prevent the obstructions to trade by the farmers. It argued the failure contravened TFEU article 34 in conjunction with TEU article 4(3) on the duty of cooperation (ex article 10 TEC).

Judgment
The Court of Justice held that TFEU article 34 was infringed, as it prohibited not only state action, but also inaction. The French authorities should have acted and would be liable for "manifestly and persistently" abstaining from taking appropriate measures.

See also

European Union law
K Muylle, ‘Angry farmers and passive policement’ (1998) 23 ELR 467

References

1997 in case law
European Union goods case law
History of agriculture in France
1997 in France